Henri Sannier (born 7 September 1947) is a French sports journalist and television presenter.

Life and career 
Henri Sannier was born in Puteaux in the department of Hauts-de-Seine. He graduated at the École supérieure de journalisme de Paris.

He also hosted  until September 1997, the evening news on France 3.

Since 1994, he hosts the sports magazine  on France 3. He is currently the chief editor of the program and was honored of it by a 7 d'Or in 2001. He is also the managing director of France Télévisions.

As a cycling enthusiast, he commentated the Tour de France in 2005 with Laurent Jalabert and in 2006 with Laurent Fignon. Henri Sannier knew that he would not comment the Tour de France in 2007.

These included Bordeaux—Paris, Berlin—Paris and in 1994 London—Paris.
He was accompanied by Jean-Michel Guidez, Patrick Chêne, Jean Mamère, Marc Toesca and others.

In 2006, he published a book with Emmanuel Galiero titled .

Personal life 

Henri Sannier is married and has two children, Antoine and Emmanuelle.

References 

1947 births
French sports journalists
French television presenters
People from Puteaux
Living people
French male non-fiction writers
École supérieure de journalisme de Paris alumni